National Science Advisor to the Prime Minister was a post that existed from 2004 to 2008. Previously, in 2003, the Privy Council Office published A Framework for the Application of Precaution in Science-based Decision Making about Risk under the government of Prime Minister Jean Chrétien. It provided a lens to assess whether precautionary decision making is in keeping with Canadians' social, environmental and economic values and priorities.

The advisor headed the Office of the National Science Advisor (ONSA), within Industry Canada, later moved to Privy Council Office. Dr. Carty was previously the President of the National Research Council and when Dr. Carty retired on March 31, 2008, the position was eliminated under the government of Stephen Harper.

In the 2015 Minister of Science Mandate Letter there was a priority to create a new Chief Science Officer position and on December 5, 2016 the Minister of Science Kirsty Duncan announced the competition for the new position, to be called Chief Science Advisor. On September 26, 2017, Prime Minister Justin Trudeau announced that Mona Nemer would fill that role.

See also 
 The Council of Canadian Academies - An independent science advisory body for the Government of Canada

References

External links 

 Council of Science and Technology Advisors - Members (archive 10 April 2007)
 Office of Science & Technology at the Embassy of Austria in Washington, DC. - Arthur Carty: Science Advisor to the Canadian Prime Minister (archive 15 April 2012)

Canada
Federal departments and agencies of Canada
Science and technology in Canada